"Baby" is a song by Italian rapper and singer Madame. It was released on 28 February 2020 by Sugar Music and was included in her debut album Madame.

Music video
The music video for "Baby", directed by Martina Pastori, premiered on 12 March 2020 via Madame's YouTube channel.

Track listing

Charts

Certifications

References

2020 songs
2020 singles
Madame (singer) songs
Sugar Music singles